Florent Marty (born 15 March 1984) is a footballer who plays as a midfielder for French Championnat National club AS Furiani-Agliani.

He signed for Championnat National side Amiens SC in the summer of 2009 from AS Lyon Duchère.

Marty previously played for FC Gueugnon in Ligue 2.

References

External links
 

1984 births
Living people
Association football midfielders
French footballers
Olympique Lyonnais players
FC Gueugnon players
Amiens SC players
Lyon La Duchère players
AS Vitré players
CA Bastia players
Louhans-Cuiseaux FC players
Borgo FC players
Footballers from Paris